Gunnar Sønstevold (26 November 1912 – 18 October 1991) was a Norwegian composer. He was born in Elverum, and married composer Maj Sønstevold in 1941. He composed orchestral works, vocal music, chamber music, and music to a number of plays, ballets and films. He headed the Music Department of the Norwegian Broadcasting Corporation/Television from 1966 to 1974. He was awarded Filmkritikerprisen in 1955, for the film Det brenner i natt!. He received the Arts Council Norway music prize in 1972, and Radioteatret's honorary prize in 1987.

Career
Sønstevold studied music in Oslo, beginning in 1932 with piano studies with Nils Larsen and Erling Westher as well as composition studies with Karl Andersen. Parallel to his studies, Sønstevold played piano and trombone in one of the leading jazz quartet of the era: Funny Boys (1932–39). After the outbreak of World War II, Sønstevold fled to Sweden where he subsequently met the composer Maj Lundén whom he married in 1941.

From 1946 to 1969, Sønstevold composed music for 40 motion pictures and three full-length documentaries. As a theatre composer, Sønstevold penned the score for Jens Bjørneboe’s Semmelweis, Henrik Ibsen’s Catalina, Tarjei Vesaas’ Bleikeplassen as well as Georg Büchner’s Woyzek. When Sønstevold composed the music for Det Norske Teatret’s 1957 performance of William Shakespeare’s The Tempest, he was one of the first Norwegian composers to utilize electronic elements in his music.

From 1960 to 1967, Sønstevold studied at the Akademie für Musik und darstellende Kunst in Vienna with his wife. This period would have a profound effect on the composer's output as he would gradually gravitate towards twelve-tone music. Works written during and after his years in Vienna include a Concerto for flute and bassoon (1964) and two ballets. One of his major works, Litany in Atlanta (1971) written in memory of Louis Armstrong, reflects his involvement in jazz. Sønstevold has also composed chamber music, songs and piano pieces, such as The Dorian Cage for three pianists performing on one piano (1964).

Active for many years as a music teacher, he and his wife Maj, started a music institute in Rakkestad, outside Oslo, in 1975, which has since become a municipal music school. He has also been active in the field of music sociology, and focused on bridging the gap between the contemporary composers and the public.

Production

Selected works

Orchestral works 
 Sinfonietta (1949)
 Concerto for saxophone and orchestra (1955)
 Concerto for flute, trombone and orchestra (1965)
 Forvandling: En fleip (1976)
 Concerto for oboe, harp and orchestra (1978)
 Kork (= Kringkastingsorkesteret)  (1979)
 Festkommentate (1981)
 Concertino for harp and orchestra (1991)

Vocal works 
 Intermezzo for soprano, violin and tape (1958)
 5 Sanger til dikt av Tarjei Vesaas, soprano and guitar (1964)
 Litani i Atlanta (text: W. E. B. du Bois, Norwegian texts: Paal Helge Haugen), choir, children's choir, jazz ensemble, orchestra (1971)
 Fredskjemperens død for choir and chamber ensemble (1978)
 Forhandlinger i et magert land for choir and chamber ensemble (1982)

Chamber music 
 String Quartet No. 1 (1945)
 Duett for flute and oboe  (1949)
 Det doriske bur for 3 pianists playing 1 piano (1964)
 Duett for harp and tuba (1970)
 Strykekvartett nr. 1, Pinter-kvartetten (1971/77)
 PianoPussel for to (1974)
 Samvirke, septet (1976)
 Crico (1977)
 Quintessens for chamber ensemble (1979)
 Sonatine for trombone and piano (1990)

Film music 
 Reisen til havet (1966)
 Klokker i måneskinn (1964)
 Om Tilla (1963)
 Omringet (1960)
 De dødes tjern (1958)
 Fjols til fjells (1957)
 Selkvinnen (1953)
 Veslefrikk med fela (1952)
 Musikk på loftet/En dukkedrøm (1952)
 Vi flyr på Rio (1949)
 Den hemmelighetsfulle leiligheten (1948)

Music for stage productions 
 Bendik og Årolija, ballet (1947)
 Musikalsk spectacel, ballet over Peer Gynt (1966)
 Koreografen, ballet (1967)
 Innberetning til et akademi (text: Franz Kafka) (1982/87)

Discography
 Elin & Egil, Dans med Prøysen - Greieste hits 2 (2007)
 Alexandra Becker, Rolf Becker, Dickie Dick Dickens - fjerde serie: Nå er han her igjen (2003)
 Alexandra Becker, Rolf Becker, Dickie Dick Dickens - tredje serie (2001)
 Alexandra Becker, Rolf Becker, Dickie Dick Dickens - andre serie (1999)
 Alexandra Becker, Rolf Becker, Dickie Dick Dickens - første serie (1998)
 Stockholm Philharmonic Wind Quintet, Elisabeth Sønstevold, Music For Wind Instruments And Harp (1994)
 Eva Knardahl, Robert Rønnes, The Norwegian Contemporary Bassoon (1992)
 Kari Svendsen, Kari går til Filmen (1991)
 Geir Henning Braaten, Norwegian Panorama (1984)

References

External links
 
List of Works supplied by the National Library of Norway 

1912 births
1991 deaths
People from Elverum
Musicians from Elverum
Norwegian composers
Norwegian male composers
NRK people
20th-century composers
20th-century Norwegian male musicians